Dawn is an unincorporated community and census-designated place (CDP) in Livingston County, Missouri, United States. As of the 2020 census it had a population of 100.

Dawn was platted in 1853. A post office called Dawn has been in operation since 1852.

Geography

The community is on high ground on the east bank of Shoal Creek, a northeast-flowing tributary of the Grand River and part of the Missouri River watershed.

Demographics

References

Unincorporated communities in Livingston County, Missouri
Unincorporated communities in Missouri
Census-designated places in Livingston County, Missouri
Census-designated places in Missouri